Devin Hoff is an American bassist, composer and arranger. Hoff has collaborated with Julia Holter, Nels Cline, Sharon Van Etten, Shannon Lay, Cibo Matto, Kira Roessler, Good For Cows, Xiu Xiu, and others.

Hoff has also released three albums of solo and multi-tracked contrabass material—Solo Bass (2009), Baile as Baile (2019), and Sigils (2018). Laurie Anderson named Solo Bass as one of her top 5 favorite albums of all time.

Selected discography
Devin Hoff - solo
 Solo Bass (2009)
 Sigils (2018)
Baile as Baile (2019)
Beautiful Radiant Things (2019)
Caustics

 Touch (2020)

Julia Holter

 Loud City Song (2013)
 In the Same Room (2017)
 Have You in My Wilderness (2015)
 Aviary (2018)

Shannon Lay

 Living Water (2017)

The Nels Cline Singers
 Instrumentals (2002)
 The Giant Pin (2004)
 Draw Breath (2007)
 Initiate (2010)

Nels Cline
 New Monastery (2006)
 Dirty Baby (2010)
Lovers (Blue Note, 2016)
ROVA + The Nels Cline Singers
 The Celestial Septet (2010)
Good for Cows
 Good for Cogs (2001)
 Less Than or Equal To (2003)
 Bebop Fantasy (2004)
 10th Anniversary Concert (2008)
 Audumla (2010)
Ether Feather

 Devil Shadowless Hand (2019)

Marc Ribot

 Songs of Resistance (2018)

Miho Hatori

 Miss Info (2018)
 New Optimism (2018)

David Lord

 Forest Standards (2018)

Tara Jane O'Neil

 Tara Jane O'Neil (2017)

Deerhoof

 Mountain Moves (2017)

Redressers
 To Each According... (2004)

Wholphin DVD magazine, No. 7
 Look at the Sun (short film soundtrack) (2008)

Steven Bernstein
 Diaspora Suite (2008)

Joshua Redman
 Let Me Down Easy (soundtrack for Anna Deavere Smith play) (2008)

Fred Frith, Larry Ochs, Darren Johnston, Devin Hoff, Ches Smith
 Reasons for Moving (2007)

Mary Halvorson, Jessica Pavone, Ches Smith, Devin Hoff
 Calling All Portraits (2008)

Carla Bozulich (feat. Willie Nelson)
 The Red Headed Stranger (2003)

Evangelista
 The Prince of Truth (2009)

Ben Goldberg
 The Door, the Hat, the Chair, the Fact (2006)

Howard Wiley
 Angola Project (2006)

Odessa Chen
 Ballad of Paper Ships (2006)
 The Archives (2011)

Sean Hayes
 Flowering Spade (2007)
 Run Wolves Run (2010)

AwkWard with Kira Roessler
 In Progress (2018)

References

External links
 Devin Hoff CD Reviews – East Bay Express
Devin Hoff - Discogs
Devin Hoff official website

Living people
Avant-garde jazz musicians
American rock bass guitarists
Singers from Colorado
Guitarists from Colorado
American male bass guitarists
21st-century double-bassists
21st-century American male musicians
American male jazz musicians
Year of birth missing (living people)
The Nels Cline Singers members
NoBusiness Records artists